Castle Danger is an unincorporated community in Silver Creek Township, Lake County, Minnesota, United States.

The community is located between Two Harbors and Beaver Bay on Minnesota Highway 61, on the North Shore of Lake Superior.

Castle Danger is located 11 miles northeast of the city of Two Harbors. Gooseberry Falls State Park is nearby.

History
Castle Danger was settled in 1890, by three Norwegian fishermen (brothers Dan, Marc, and Tom Lind), although the site was already occupied by lumber companies. The exact origin of the name is unknown, although it might have come from the cliffs on the shore resembling a castle; from a boat named Castle that grounded here; or from the Walter Scott novel Castle Dangerous (1831).

References

Unincorporated communities in Minnesota
Unincorporated communities in Lake County, Minnesota